The Buddhist flag is a flag designed in the late 19th century as a universal symbol of Buddhism. It is used by Buddhists throughout the world.

History

The flag was originally designed in 1885 by the Colombo Committee, in Colombo, Ceylon (now Sri Lanka). The committee consisted of Ven. Hikkaduwe Sri Sumangala Thera (chairman), Ven. Migettuwatte Gunananda Thera, Don Carolis Hewavitharana (father of Anagarika Dharmapala), Andiris Perera Dharmagunawardhana (maternal grandfather of Anagarika Dharmapala), Charles A. de Silva, Peter De Abrew, William De Abrew (father of Peter), H. William Fernando, N. S. Fernando and Carolis Pujitha Gunawardena (secretary).

It was first publicly hoisted on Vesak day, 28 May 1885 at the Dipaduttamarama, Kotahena, by Ven. Migettuwatte Gunananda Thera. This was the first Vesak public holiday under British rule.

Colonel Henry Steel Olcott, an American journalist, founder and first president of the Theosophical Society, felt that its long streaming shape made it inconvenient for general use. He therefore suggested modifying it so that it was the size and shape of national flags.

In 1889, the modified flag was introduced to Japan by Anagarika Dharmapala and Olcott—who presented it to Emperor Meiji—and subsequently to Burma.

At the 1950 World Fellowship of Buddhists, the flag of Buddhists was adopted as the International Buddhist Flag.

Colors
The flag's six vertical bands represent the six colors of the aura which Buddhists believe emanated from the body of the Buddha when he attained Enlightenment:

 Blue (Pāli and Sanskrit: nīla): The Spirit of Universal Compassion
 Yellow (Pāli and Sanskrit: pīta): The Middle Way
 Red (Pāli and Sanskrit: lohitaka): The Blessings of Practice – achievement, wisdom, virtue, fortune and dignity
 White: The Purity of Dhamma – leading to liberation, timeless
 Orange, alternatively scarlet: The Wisdom of the Buddha's teachings

The sixth vertical band, on the fly, is made up of a combination of the five other colors' rectangular bands, and represents a compound of said colors in the aura's spectrum. This new, compound color is referred to as the Truth of the Buddha's teaching or Pabbhassara.

Variants

 The colour mañjeṭṭha is interpreted as pink in Myanmar, a Theravāda Buddhist country.
 In Japan, there is a traditional Buddhist flag (五色幕 — goshikimaku) which has different colors but is sometimes merged with the design of the international flag to represent international cooperation.
 In Tibet, the stripes' colors represent the different colors of Buddhist robes comprehensively united in one banner. Tibetan monastic robes are maroon, so the orange stripes in the original design are often replaced with maroon.
 Tibetan Buddhists in Nepal replace the orange stripes with plum stripes.
 Theravāda Buddhists in Thailand opt for the usage of a yellow flag with a red dhammacakka (ธงธรรมจักร - thong thammajak); it is sometimes paired with the international Buddhist flag. It was officially adopted in 1958 by Buddhist monks, and flown outside temples alongside the national flag and on important events.
 Soka Gakkai uses a tricolor of blue, yellow, and red. It is often mistaken for the flags of Chad and Romania.

Bans 

In 1963, the Catholic President of South Vietnam Ngo Dinh Diem invoked a law prohibiting flags other than that of the nation, to ban the Buddhist flag from being flown on Vesak, when Vatican flags had habitually flown at government events. This led to protests, which were ended by lethal firing of weapons, starting the Buddhist crisis.

References

External links

 Buddhist flag at Flags of the World
 General Buddhist symbols

Rainbow flags
Buddhist symbols
Religious flags
Symbols introduced in the 1800s
1885 establishments in Ceylon
Flags introduced in 1885